Fucun is a town of Gaoyi County in southwestern Hebei province, China, located  west of the county seat. , it has 20 villages under its administration.

See also
List of township-level divisions of Hebei

References

Township-level divisions of Hebei
Gaoyi County